Bowling Green is an unincorporated community predominantly located in Nether Providence Township in Delaware County, Pennsylvania, United States. However, parts are also located in Upper Providence Township  and Media, Pennsylvania.  Bowling Green is located in the northwestern corner of the township east of Media.

References

Unincorporated communities in Delaware County, Pennsylvania
Unincorporated communities in Pennsylvania